Wyandot Mission Church is a historic church in Upper Sandusky, Ohio.

It was built in 1824 under the direction of Reverend James B. Finley and added to the National Register of Historic Places in 1976.

The Wyandot Mission Church, located on East Church Street in the Old Mission Cemetery, is the first officially recognized mission of the Methodist Episcopal Church in America.  Many of the Wyandot people from the Grand Reservation worshipped there until the U.S. Government ordered their relocation to Kansas in 1843.    

The church was restored in 1889 and designated a National Shrine of the Methodist Church in 1960.  A historical marker was placed at the church in 2003 for the celebration of Ohio's bicentennial anniversary.

References

Churches in Ohio
Churches on the National Register of Historic Places in Ohio
Churches completed in 1824
Buildings and structures in Wyandot County, Ohio
National Register of Historic Places in Wyandot County, Ohio
19th-century Methodist church buildings in the United States